Gabriel Fernández (born 3 April 1992) is an Argentine professional footballer who plays as a defender for Club Atlético Güemes.

Career
Central Córdoba became Fernández's first senior club in 2013. After making his senior debut against Central Norte on 29 March, Fernández featured in four further fixtures during 2012–13 as the club were eliminated from the promotion play-offs by Libertad. He remained for one more Torneo Argentino A season, prior to departing on 21 July 2014 to fellow tier three team San Lorenzo. His opening goal arrived three months later during a draw with Estudiantes, which was followed by a brace against Américo Tesorieri weeks later on 26 October. January 2015 saw Fernández resign for Central Córdoba; newly-promoted to Primera B Nacional.

Four goals across sixty-one matches subsequently occurred for the Santiago del Estero club, who were relegated in the 2016–17 campaign. Fernández spent 2017–18 back in the second tier on loan with Instituto. He was selected thirteen times for them over ten months. On 21 August 2018, Fernández joined Gimnasia y Esgrima. He was sent off on his second appearance versus Deportivo Morón, receiving a straight red card after thirty-six minutes of a goalless draw.

Career statistics
.

References

External links

1992 births
Living people
Sportspeople from Santiago del Estero Province
Argentine footballers
Association football defenders
Torneo Argentino A players
Torneo Federal A players
Primera Nacional players
Central Córdoba de Santiago del Estero footballers
Instituto footballers
Gimnasia y Esgrima de Mendoza footballers
Club Atlético Alvarado players